Hawaii National Park may refer to:

 Hawaiʻi Volcanoes National Park, formerly part of Hawaii National Park
 Haleakalā National Park, formerly part of Hawaii National Park